Aníbal Peralta Galicia (born 13 July 1947) is a Mexican politician affiliated with the Institutional Revolutionary Party. As of 2014 he served as Deputy of the LIX Legislature of the Mexican Congress as a plurinominal representative.

References

1947 births
Living people
Politicians from Veracruz
Members of the Chamber of Deputies (Mexico)
Institutional Revolutionary Party politicians
21st-century Mexican politicians
People from Orizaba
Deputies of the LIX Legislature of Mexico